The Lola T590, and its evolutions, the Lola T592, the Lola T592S, the Lola T594, the Lola T594C, the Lola T596, the Lola T596C, the Lola T598, and the Lola T598C, are a series of Sports 2000 and C Sports prototype race cars, designed, developed and built by British manufacturer Lola, for sports car racing, in 1980.

References

Sports prototypes
T590